Mohamed Ahmed Mohamud a.k.a. Dhakool is a Member of Parliament of Somaliland.

Mohamed have been accused of having links to Puntland and SSC and been involved in several attacks on high profile persons in the Sool region in Somaliland. 
Some of the attacks he is accused of having connection to:
On July 1, 2011, Nadifo Mohamed Ol-ujoog, Chairman of Sool Women's Association was shot and wounded.
On March 7, 2011, Mohamed Mohamud Hirsi (Asad) (late husband of Nadifo), leader of Central Investigative Unit in Sool region was killed and his deputy Arab Warsame was injured.
In November 2009 Cornel Ahmed Dahir, who was in charge of the police in Sool region was killed by a roadside bomb.

References

Living people
United Peoples' Democratic Party politicians
Somaliland politicians
Year of birth missing (living people)